John Joseph Dufficy (2 November 1901 – 6 November 1969) was an Australian politician. He was the Labor Party member for Warrego in the Legislative Assembly of Queensland from 1951 to 1969 when he died in Queensland Australia at age 68.

References

1901 births
1969 deaths
Members of the Queensland Legislative Assembly
Place of birth missing
Australian Labor Party members of the Parliament of Queensland
20th-century Australian politicians